Route 101 is 76 kilometres long and runs from downtown Fredericton to a junction with Route 7 in Welsford. 

The highway follows Regent Street from downtown Fredericton up a large hill to the edge of the city, where it continues south to New Maryland, Nasonworth, Beaver Dam Tracyville and Tracy at Route 645. From Tracy, the highway turns east along the South Branch of the Oromocto River to Fredericton Junction. Route 101 then turns southeast, paralleling the New Brunswick Southern Railway line through Blissville, Hoyt and Wirral crossing Route 7 to its end at Eagle Rock road at Welsford.

History
Route 101 was known as Route 28 until 1965.
October 2013 the route was extended over a new section of Route 7 and now ends at Eagle Rock Road at Welsford.

See also
List of New Brunswick provincial highways

References

New Brunswick provincial highways
Roads in York County, New Brunswick
Roads in Sunbury County, New Brunswick
Roads in Queens County, New Brunswick
Roads in Kings County, New Brunswick
Transport in Fredericton